Elizabeth "Liz" Campos (born May 8, 1969) is an American politician serving as a member of the Texas House of Representatives from the 119th district. Elected in November 2020, she assumed office on January 12, 2021.

Career 
For 30 years, Campos worked as a legal administrator at several law firms in Texas. She later served as a staffer in the Texas Senate, where she worked as a constituent coordinator, Senate district director, and chief of staff. Campos was elected to the Texas House of Representatives in November 2020 and assumed office on January 12, 2021.

References

External links
 Campaign website
 State legislative page

1969 births
Living people
Texas Democrats
Hispanic and Latino American state legislators in Texas
Hispanic and Latino American women in politics
Women state legislators in Texas
People from San Antonio
Politicians from San Antonio
21st-century American women